Arnold Oxspring (born c. 1876; death year unknown) was an English footballer who played with Doncaster Rovers and Barnsley around the 1900s.

Playing career

Doncaster Rovers
Coming from the Ecclesfield club, Oxspring was signed by Doncaster Rovers to replace McUrich at inside right who had broken his leg. In his debut on 4 September 1887 he scored 4 in a 6–0 home win over Long Eaton Rangers in the Midland League.

On 5 November 1888, he scored two in Doncaster's joint highest win, a 14–0 victory over Huddersfield Town. Over three seasons, Oxspring scored 56 goals in the Midland League, Yorkshire League, Wharncliffe Charity Cup League, and FA Cup.

Barnsley
Football League club Barnsley signed him for the start of the 1900–01 season. He played in the left half position and went on to become club captain.

Honours

Doncaster Rovers
 Midland League Champions: 1898–99
 Yorkshire League Runners-up: 1898–99

References

English footballers
Association football inside forwards
Association football wing halves
Ecclesfield F.C. players
Doncaster Rovers F.C. players
Barnsley F.C. players
Midland Football League players
English Football League players
1870s births
Year of death missing